is a former Japanese football player.

Playing career
Sakimoto was born in Sakai on April 14, 1982. After graduating from high school, he joined J1 League club Gamba Osaka based in his local in 2001. Although he debuted in 2001, he could hardly play in the match until 2003. In 2004, he moved to Japan Football League club Sagawa Express Osaka and played many matches. He retired end of 2004 season.

Club statistics

References

External links

1982 births
Living people
Association football people from Osaka Prefecture
People from Sakai, Osaka
Japanese footballers
J1 League players
Japan Football League players
Gamba Osaka players
Sagawa Shiga FC players
Association football midfielders